The Jacques Cartier Stakes is a Thoroughbred horse race run annually since 1954 at Woodbine Racetrack in Toronto, Ontario, Canada. Run near the beginning of the Woodbine spring meeting, the sprint race is open to horses aged four and older and is run over a distance of six furlongs on Tapeta synthetic dirt. In 2019, it became a Grade III stakes race and the purse was increased to Can$125,000 with an additional $25,000 available for Ontario-bred horses.
 
Inaugurated in 1954 at the now defunct Greenwood Raceway in Toronto, the Jacques Cartier Stakes is named in honour of  the French explorer, Jacques Cartier. It was raced at Woodbine Racetrack from 1956 through 1967 after which it was hosted by Fort Erie Racetrack through 1975. In 1976 the race returned to Greenwood Raceway where it remained through 1993. It returned to its prest location at Woodbine Racetrack in 1994.

The race was run in two divisions in 1984.

Since inception it has been contested at various distances:
 6 furlongs : 1954-1975, 1994–present
 6.5 furlongs : 1976
 7 furlongs : 1977-1993

Records
Speed  record: 
 1:08.05 - Pink Lloyd (2018) (at current distance of 6 furlongs)

Most wins:
 4 - Pink Lloyd (2017, 2018, 2019,2020)
 3 - Essence Hit Man  (2011, 2012, 2013)
 2 - Hidden Treasure (1961, 1962)
 2 - E. Day (1965, 1966)
 2 - Park Romeo (1976, 1977)
 2 - Overskate (1979, 1980)
 2 - Wake At Noon (2001, 2002)

Most wins by an owner:
 4 - Sam-Son Farm (1973, 1990, 1995, 2000)
 4 - Entourage Stables (2017, 2018, 2019, 2020)

Most wins by a jockey:
 6 - Avelino Gomez (1956, 1957, 1959, 1961, 1973, 1977)
 6 - Robin Platts (1974, 1975, 1978, 1979, 1980, 1987)

Most wins by a trainer:
 5 - Robert P. Tiller (2003, 2017, 2018, 2019, 2020)
 4 - Lou Cavalaris, Jr. (1967, 1968, 1974, 1975)
 4 - Gil Rowntree (1978, 1979, 1980, 1986)

Winners

See also
 List of Canadian flat horse races

References

 Jacques Cartier Stakes history at Woodbine Entertainment

Recurring sporting events established in 1954
Woodbine Racetrack
Sport in Toronto
1954 establishments in Ontario
Graded stakes races in Canada